Harttiella longicauda is a species of catfish in the family Loricariidae. It is native to South America, where it occurs in mountainous areas in the vicinity of Trinité Massif and Balenfois Massif in northern French Guiana. The species reaches 5.2 cm (2 inches) in standard length. It is known to occur alongside the species Characidium fasciadorsale, Krobia itanyi, Lithoxus planquettei, and Rhamdia quelen, as well as members of the genera Ancistrus, Guyanancistrus, Melanocharacidium, and Rineloricaria. The species was described in 2012 as part of a taxonomic review of members of the loricariid tribe Harttiini native to the Guianas.

References 

Loricariidae
Fish described in 2012
Catfish of South America
Fish of French Guiana